The individual dressage at the 2010 FEI World Equestrian Games in Lexington, Kentucky, United States of America was held at Kentucky Horse Park from September 25 to October 1, 2010.

Dutch Edward Gal won the gold medal in the Grand Prix Special and Grand Prix Freestyle. Laura Bechtolsheimer representing Great Britain won a silver medal in the Grand Prix Special and Grand Prix Freestyle and the Steffen Peters won bronze in the Special and Freestyle as well, becoming the first American dressage rider made it on the individual podium at a World Championship.

Competition format

The team and individual dressage competitions used the same results. Dressage had three phases. The first phase was the Grand Prix. The top 30 individuals advanced to the second phase, the Grand Prix Special where the first individual medals were awarded. The Individual Grand Prix Freestyle was the third phase where the best 15 competed and the final individual medals were awarded.

Judges
The Grand Prix, Grand Prix Special and Grand Prix Freestyle were assessed by a group of seven appointed judges, five judges each phase. The president of the ground jury was the Linda Zang from The United States of America. Her colleagues were Stephen Clarke from Great Britain, Cara Whitham from Canada, Evi Eisenhardt from Germany, Ghislain Fouarge from The Netherlands, Maribel Alonso de Quinzanos from Mexico and Mary Seefried from Australia. Wojtech Markowski from Poland was the Technical Delegate.

Schedule

Results

References

2010 in equestrian